Cut Foot Sioux Lake is a lake in Itasca County, in the U.S. state of Minnesota. The Cut Foot Sioux Trail takes hikers past the lake.

Cut Foot Sioux Lake was named for an injured Sioux Indian who died there.

See also
List of lakes in Minnesota

References

Lakes of Minnesota
Lakes of Itasca County, Minnesota